In head coach John R. Wooden's final game, the 1974–75 UCLA Bruins men's basketball team won the team's tenth National Championship in twelve years over the Kentucky Wildcats (92–85), in the San Diego Sports Arena, San Diego, California.

The Bruins defeated Michigan in the first round. In the West Regional, UCLA beat Montana and Arizona State to advance to the Final Four. Washington scored 26 points to give UCLA an overtime victory over Louisville, 75–74, in the semi-finals game. After the game, Coach Wooden announced that the championship game would be his last game.

Season Summary
This UCLA team was far from the most talented coached  by the legendary John Wooden. It was a team without superstars, in fact, but it turned out to be one of Wooden's favorites, for it sent him into retirement with a 92–85 victory over Kentucky in the 1975 National Title game behind center Richard Washington’s 28 points. The championship was Wooden’s 10th, a record which still stands for men's coaches. Geno Auriemma of Connecticut broke the overall basketball record by winning his 11th title in 2016.

Roster

Schedule

|-
!colspan=9 style=|Regular Season

|-
!colspan=12 style="background:#;"| NCAA Tournament

Notes
 The team won their first 12 games before Stanford pulled an upset on the Bruins.
 The NCAA first round was held at Pullman, Washington; West Regional at Portland, Oregon.
 "He (Coach Wooden) never made more than $35,000 a year, including 1975, the year he won his 10th national championship, and never asked for a raise," wrote Rick Reilly of ESPN.
 Richard Washington was named NCAA basketball tournament Most Outstanding Player.

References

External links
1974–75 UCLA Bruins at Sports-Reference.com

Ucla Bruins
UCLA Bruins men's basketball seasons
NCAA Division I men's basketball tournament championship seasons
NCAA Division I men's basketball tournament Final Four seasons
Ucla
UCLA
UCLA